Lyubov Andreyevna Ivanovskaya Polyanskaya (Russian Любовь Андреевна Ивановская, also transliterated as Lubov or, e.g. by the ITU, as Liubov Ivanovskaya), born 20 June 1989, is a Russian professional triathlete from Yaroslavl and a permanent member of the Russian National Elite Team.
Lyubov Ivanovskaya's maiden name still appears in official ITU rankings, in official FTR documents, however, she is now referred to with her new surname Polyanskaya only.

Sports career 
Lyubov Ivanovskaya attended a high performance sports school in Yaroslavl, the Специализированная детско-юношеская школа олимпийского резерва N. 7. In 2005, she was among the 60 excellent students who were granted 500 ruble a month by the governor of the Oblast Yaroslavl.
According to the Russian Triathlon Federation's ranking of the year 2009, she was number 4 of all Russian female Elite triathletes, and number 7 in the Russian Cup ranking.
In the individual Elite ranking of the year 2010 Ivanovskaya is number 5.
At the 2010 Youth Spartakiad she placed 4th.
At the Russian Elite Aquathlon Championships 2011 Ivanovskaya won the bronze medal.

Ivanovskaya also took part in various non ITU events, e.g. in Cyprus on 12 April 2009 and in Brazil on 28 February 2010.

French Club Championship Series 
In 2010 Lyubov Ivanovskaya took part in the prestigious French Club Championship series Lyonnaise des Eaux representing the club Sainte-Geneviève Triathlon.
The only triathlon of this circuit she attended, however, was the opening triathlon at Dunkirk (23 May 2010). Though placing 44th, Ivanovskaya was among the three  and the second best runner of her club behind Alexandra Razarenova.

ITU Competitions 
In the seven years from 2004 to 2010, Ivanovskaya took part in 25 ITU competitions and achieved 10 top ten positions.
The following list is based upon the official ITU rankings and the Athlete's Profile Page. Unless indicated otherwise, the events are triathlons (Olympic Distance) and belong to the Elite category.

BG = the sponsor British Gas · DNF = did not finish

Notes

External links 
 ITU Profile Page
 Russian Triathlon Federation in Russian

1989 births
Living people
Russian female triathletes
Sportspeople from Yaroslavl